Adewale Ayuba (born 6 May 1966, commonly known as Mr. Johnson), is a Nigerian singer known for singing Fuji music.

Biography

Early life and education 

Adewale Ayuba, popularly  known as Ayuba, Mr. Johnson, and the Bonsue-fuji maestro, was born on 6 May 1966 in Ikenne Remo, Ogun State, Nigeria. He grew up as a child singer, and by the age of eight he had started singing at local musical competitions and fiestas in Ikenne. This led to him pursuing music as a career after his secondary school education at Remo Secondary School, Sagamu, Ogun State.

Although he had gained admission to study Architecture at the Ogun State Polytechnic in Abeokuta, his music career took center stage. To carve a niche for himself, Ayuba released his first album Ibere (Beginning) at the age of 17 and as a result he rose rapidly in the Fuji music scene. In early 1990, Ayuba signed with Sony Music (Nigerian) to record an album, Bubble, which was released in 1991 and brought Ayuba into international prominence. Bubble marked the first time in history that a Fuji Music album gained widespread recognition, topping music charts for six consecutive months and winning multiple awards at the Nigerian Music Awards (NMA). It also won Ayuba the coveted Artiste of the Year Awards, including the Album of the Year Award, Song of the Year Award, and Best Fuji Album of the Year Award—four in all. With the success of Bubble, Ayuba hit the pinnacle of his career in Nigeria.

Ayuba's high-tech instrumentation and distinct voice changed the face of Fuji Music. For the first time in History, the Nigerian Elite, who until then had ignored Fuji Music, embraced it. After the success of Bubble, Ayuba released a follow-up album, Mr. Johnson Play For Me (also on the Sony Music Nigeria label), which also became an instant success in 1992. In 1993, Ayuba was signed to Premier Music (Nigeria) before embarking on his first West Africa coast tour, performing in several African countries. The success of this tour led to his first US tour, also in 1993, during which Ayuba performed in over ten states. He also successfully performed at the world-renowned New Orleans Jazz Festival. In addition, he was awarded the Key to the City of Providence, Rhode Island by its mayor after two successful concerts there. His Los Angeles debut was also a success, and C.C. Smith of Los Angeles Weekly Magazine wrote that "Ayuba bases his Fuji on two elemental forces—rhythm, and the human voice—to create compelling, enchanting and powerful sound. Expect frenzied dancing style and colorful costumes, exultant fans and enough talking drums and percussion to remedy even a terminal case of sensory deprivation."

After his return in 1993, Ayuba released another chart-topping album, Buggle D, on the Premier Music (Nigeria) label. It gained even more recognition than Bubble and won multiple awards at the Fame Music Awards, topping the music chart for several months. In 1994, Ayuba took a bold step with a vision to "[internationalize] Fuji Music" and toured the UK and the US with his band. He recorded while in America in 1995, and he performed at various international concerts including the 1996 Summer State Concerts in New York, the African Mondo Concerts of 1996 and 1997, the New Orleans Jazz Festival of 1997, the 1997 International Festival in Houston, Texas, and the Black Entertainment Television Jazz USA Concert. Ayuba was signed by US-based Q-disc Record Company for a year contract and released Fuji Time on the company's label in 1996. In 1997, he released Fuji Dub on the Agogo Music Label in London.

In 1998, he came back to Nigeria and released another successful album, Acceleration, on the Corporate Music label. In 2000, he released another album, Turn Me On, which broke music records in Nigeria and emerged as the Best Fuji Album of the Year at the Awards for Musical Excellence in Nigeria and as the Best Song of The Year at the Nigerian Song Festival 2000. In the same year, he toured several European countries including England, Ireland, the Netherlands and Belgium. He was awarded as a Distinguished Son of Ikenne Remo, his birthplace, in 2001 in a colorful ceremony at the Ikenne Local Government in Ogun State. In 2001, Ayuba had a spectacular performance at the Eko Le Meridien Hotel Banquet hall, Lagos, in a concert tagged "The Return of Ayuba". This concert made history in Nigeria, as the Executive Governors of Lagos and Ogun state, Federal and State Legislators, and several commissioners were in attendance, among other dignitaries. Following this concert, the media proclaiming Ayuba as the most corporate Fuji musician ever.

Ayuba and his band also toured Austria in 2001, performing in Graz and Vienna. In 2002, he once again toured Europe for four months, performing in England, France, Belgium, Austria and the Netherlands. While on this tour, Ayuba recorded another album, Formula, which in 2002 emerged as the Best Fuji Album of the Year at the Awards for Musical Excellence in Nigeria. In 2002, the Music Advertisers Association of Nigeria named Ayuba the Best Artiste of the Millennium. In 2003, Ayuba again toured Europe, performing in Cologne, Hamburg, Berlin, Essen, Krefeld, Paris, Antwerp, Amsterdam, Bologna, Naples, Turin, and Genoa. While on this tour, he recorded a joint album, Fuji Satisfaction, with German-based Afro-centric Music group Bantu, which won two Awards—The Best Group in West Africa and The Best Group in Africa at the Kora Music Awards in Durban, South Africa.

Ayuba was awarded the Millennium Voice of Nigerian Music (home and abroad) in Düsseldorf, (Germany) by Pan-Yoruba Group, Omo Oduduwa Association, in recognition of his valuable contributions to the growth of the music industry. In 2004, Ayuba released Ijo Fuji (Fuji Dance) in Nigeria, and was also given the Entertainer of the Year Award by the Nigerian American Community Association in the same year. Ijo Fuji won the Best Fuji Album of the Year Award at the Awards for Musical Excellence in Nigeria in July 2005.

In 2004, the Ikenne Development Association in Chicago gave him its Ogo-irawo award in recognition of his contribution to the development of Ikenne Remo, his birthplace. Ayuba's album, Mellow, which became a success after release, won the Best Fuji Vocal Performance at the (AMEN) 2007 Awards, which topped Nigeria's contemporary African charts. Mr Johnson also holds a Doctorate of Arts in Music at Bradley University.

Music career 

Ayuba began singing as a child. His father was an amateur singer but reinforced the value of education, making his son agree to focus on his education during the week and allowing him to practice his music on Saturday.

Since signing his first record deal in the 1980s, he has released 15 albums in Nigeria and four internationally.

Public image 
Ayuba has been crowned as the King of Bonsue Fuji, as he was the original artiste who coined the musical genre as a subgenre of Fuji Music.

Awards and honors 
Ayuba won two Kora Awards in 2005.

Ayuba is a member of the Nigerian Red Cross and was dubbed "Prince Of Peace" in 2012.

Family 
Ayuba is the last child of his parents, and he is married with seven children. Ayuba met his wife Azukaego Kwentoh at a cafeteria in Queens Borough Community College where he studied, and they got married in 1989. Kwentoh is from Onitsha-Oke, Anambra State in southeastern Nigeria. In 2015, Ayuba Adewale who was born a Muslim converted to the Christian faith.

Filmography 
Ayuba acted as a journalist in the movie Mystery of Unity, which was produced by Ebun Oloyede.

Artistry 
Ayuba writes all his songs and works for productions and performances hand-in-hand with his fifteen-man band, Ayuba and the Bonsue Fuji Band, of which Ayuba is the lead singer. He grew up with his band as a part of his musical career and his success. His signature sound in his music is the Yoruba talking drum and sometimes American percussion.

Legacy 
Ayuba aims to take fuji music to the whole world, just as Bob Marley had taken reggae to the whole world.

Fashion lines 
In 2013, Ayuba signed on his long time diligent stylist and fashion designer to introduce Bonsue Wears, which boosted awareness of his style around the world. Ayuba had always loved traditional Yoruba outfits, such as the Shokoto and bubba outfit. He was comfortable performing in the clothes he wore onstage, and they have since defined his signature look. The couture consists of a two-piece attire: a shirt-like top with free opening sleeves, and a pair of matching pants which gather at the knees. The bonsue fashion line blends traditional Yoruba styles with the urban touch.

Other ventures 
Ayuba supports his music trade as a businessman, using the Diploma in Financial Accounting he received at the Queens Borough Community College, New York.

References

External links
Ayuba's biography

Nigerian singer-songwriters
Living people
1966 births
University of Lagos alumni
Musicians from Ogun State
20th-century Nigerian male singers
Yoruba musicians
Yoruba-language singers
Moshood Abiola Polytechnic alumni
Nigerian expatriates in the United States
21st-century Nigerian male singers